The 2020 United States Senate election in Mississippi was held on November 3, 2020, to elect a member of the United States Senate to represent the State of Mississippi, concurrently with the 2020 U.S. presidential election, as well as other elections to the United States Senate, elections to the United States House of Representatives and various state and local elections.

Incumbent Republican Senator Cindy Hyde-Smith won reelection to a full term against Democratic nominee Mike Espy, in a rematch of the 2018 special election. Despite being outspent nearly four to one, Hyde-Smith won by a ten-point margin; however, she underperformed Republican President Donald Trump in the concurrent presidential election by around 6 points.

Republican primary

Candidates

Nominee
Cindy Hyde-Smith, incumbent U.S. Senator

Declined
Gerard Gibert, businessman and vice chairman of the Mississippi Lottery Board
Chris McDaniel, incumbent state senator and candidate for U.S. Senate in 2014 and 2018
Josh Randle, former president of the Miss America Organization

Endorsements

Results

Democratic primary

Candidates

Nominee
Mike Espy, former United States Secretary of Agriculture, former U.S. Representative for Mississippi's 2nd congressional district, and nominee for U.S. Senate in 2018

Eliminated in primary
Tobey Bartee, former military intelligence officer and candidate for U.S. Senate in 2018
Jensen Bohren, teacher, candidate for U.S. Senate in 2018

Declined
J. P. Hughes Jr., state representative and candidate for Lieutenant Governor of Mississippi in 2019
 Brandon Presley, member of the Mississippi Public Service Commission

Endorsements

Results

Other candidates

Libertarian Party

Nominee
Jimmy Edwards

General election

Predictions

Endorsements

Polling
Graphical summary

Results

Notes

References

External links
 
 
  (State affiliate of the U.S. League of Women Voters)
 

Official campaign websites
 Mike Espy (D) for Senate
 Cindy Hyde-Smith (R) for Senate

2020
Mississippi
United States Senate